The 2010-11 Nemzeti Bajnokság II competition is a Hungarian domestic rugby club competition operated by the Magyar Rögbi Szövetség (MRgSz). It began on September 18, 2010 with a match between Medvék and Velencei Kék Cápák at the Cinkotai Royal Ground in Budapest, and continued through to the final in 2011.

Competition format
It consists of one section with six teams. Matches are played over ten rounds.

The teams

Table

References

Nemzeti Bajnoksag II
2010 in Hungarian sport
2011 in Hungarian sport
Rugby union leagues in Hungary